The Post Office Girl (which roughly means The Intoxication of Transformation) is a novel by the Austrian writer Stefan Zweig. It tells the story of Christine Hoflehner, a female post-office clerk in a small town near Vienna, Austria-Hungary, during the poverty-stricken years following World War I. The book was published posthumously in 1982.

Plot
Christine is an Austrian public servant in a post-office job in a poverty-stricken city near St. Pölten in Lower Austria. She is a blonde woman whose mother is sick and whose father had died during World War I. One day, Christine receives an obscure telegram and sends it to her sickly mother. Upon reading more closely the telegram, Christine's mother is overcome by happiness by discovering that a few unknown relatives from America, Christine's aunt (Claire) and uncle, would take her on an upper-class trip to Pontresina, Switzerland. Christine is reluctant to go at first, but she concedes.

Arriving in Switzerland, she is stunned by her relative poverty compared to the inhabitants and people from the bourgeois Hotel. She feels excluded due to her humble and troubling origins. Claire, her aunt from America, decides to transform her into a socialite and to make her more elegant in order to better fit the bourgeoise society in which she currently is. Christine changes her name, dresses and manner. She feels happier than she ever has during those few weeks, enjoying them frenetically. Nevertheless, her humble origins are eventually discovered by some, and Christine cannot stay there, triggering Claire to cancel their trip and return to America.

Christine returns to her home in Austria, feeling beaten down and nostalgic for her time spent at the hotel in Switzerland. After comparing her past trip to her current location, an impoverished post-World War I Austrian city and her current job, she falls into a deep depression and feels wholly unhappy and discontented both with her job and life. Eventually, she meets Ferdinand, a friend of a poor relative of hers who had fought in World War I, and had been taken as a prisoner of war to Siberia. He is also in poverty and has lost all that he had by the war. After a few dates and casual encounters, they realize and share a deep depression, and eventually decide to commit suicide together, reluctant to do it alone.

After Christine takes care of tying loose ends in her workplace in preparation for their joint suicide, she is then met by Ferdinand to go to the location where they have decided to commit the suicidal act. However, as Ferdinand takes a look at Christine's workplace, he notices a large amount of cash which he could steal. After some deliberation on the matter, Ferdinand realizes he need not kill himself if he can escape poverty through the stealing of government money from Christine's workplace. They then agree to postpone the suicide. After contemplating more on the matter, Ferdinand comes up with an elaborate plan to commit the theft and then proposes it to Christine. Christine is reluctant at first, but after delicate elaboration, agrees to the commitment of the robbery.

Reception
Lorna Bradbury of The Daily Telegraph wrote in 2009: "The Post Office Girl is a fine novel – and an excellent place to start if you are new to this great Austrian novelist. It is a powerful social history, describing in moving detail the social impact of the First World War, and the extreme poverty in which so many people were forced to live. ... Zweig succeeded in taking the most complex concepts of psychoanalysis and bringing them vividly to life." John Banville reviewed the book in The Guardian: "The Post Office Girl is fierce, sad, moving and, ultimately, frightening. True, it is over-written – Simenon would have done it better, in half the space – but it is also hypnotic in its downward spiral into tragedy."

In popular culture
Wes Anderson admitted to basing The Grand Budapest Hotel on The Post Office Girl and Beware of Pity.

See also
 1982 in literature
 Austrian literature

References

1982 novels
Austrian novels
German-language novels
Novels by Stefan Zweig
Novels published posthumously
S. Fischer Verlag books